This is a complete list of clinically approved prescription antidepressants throughout the world, as well as clinically approved prescription drugs used to augment antidepressants or mood stabilizers, by pharmacological and/or structural classification. Chemical/generic names are listed first, with brand names in parentheses. All drugs listed are approved specifically for major depressive disorder unless noted otherwise.

Selective serotonin reuptake inhibitors (SSRIs)
 Citalopram (Celexa, Cipramil)
 Escitalopram (Lexapro, Cipralex)
 Fluoxetine (Prozac, Sarafem)
 Fluvoxamine (Luvox, Faverin)
 Paroxetine (Paxil, Seroxat)
 Sertraline (Zoloft, Lustral)

Discontinued/withdrawn
 Indalpine (Upstene)
 Zimelidine (Normud, Zelmid)

Serotonin–norepinephrine reuptake inhibitors (SNRIs)
 Desvenlafaxine (Pristiq)
 Duloxetine (Cymbalta)
 Levomilnacipran (Fetzima)
 Milnacipran (Ixel, Savella, Milnaneurax)
 Venlafaxine (Effexor, Trevilor)

Serotonin modulators and stimulators (SMSs)
 Vilazodone (Viibryd)
 Vortioxetine (Trintellix, Brintellix)

Serotonin antagonist and reuptake inhibitors (SARIs)
 Nefazodone (Dutonin, Nefadar, Serzone) – withdrawn/discontinued in most countries
 Trazodone (Desyrel)

Discontinued/withdrawn
 Etoperidone (Axiomin, Etonin)

Norepinephrine reuptake inhibitors (NRIs)
 Reboxetine (Edronax)
 Teniloxazine (Lucelan, Metatone) – also a 5-HT2A receptor antagonist
 Viloxazine (Vivalan) – also a 5-HT2B receptor antagonist and 5-HT2C receptor agonist

Off-label only
 Atomoxetine (Strattera)

Norepinephrine–dopamine reuptake inhibitors (NDRIs)
 Bupropion (Wellbutrin, Elontril) – also a non-competitive antagonist of nicotinic acetylcholine receptors

Off-label only
 Amphetamines (e.g., Adderall, Dexedrine, Vyvanse) – actually norepinephrine–dopamine releasing agents (NDRAs)
 Methylphenidate (Ritalin)
 Modafinil (Provigil) – actually a selective dopamine reuptake inhibitor plus other actions

Discontinued/withdrawn
 Amineptine (Survector, Maneon)
 Nomifensine (Merital, Alival)

Tricyclic antidepressants (TCAs)
 Amitriptyline (Elavil, Endep)
 Amitriptylinoxide (Amioxid, Ambivalon, Equilibrin)
 Clomipramine (Anafranil)
 Desipramine (Norpramin, Pertofrane)
 Dibenzepin (Noveril, Victoril)
 Dimetacrine (Istonil)
 Dosulepin (Prothiaden)
 Doxepin (Adapin, Sinequan)
 Imipramine (Tofranil)
 Lofepramine (Lomont, Gamanil)
 Melitracen (Dixeran, Melixeran, Trausabun)
 Nitroxazepine (Sintamil)
 Nortriptyline (Pamelor, Aventyl)
 Noxiptiline (Agedal, Elronon, Nogedal)
 Opipramol (Insidon)
 Pipofezine (Azafen/Azaphen)
 Protriptyline (Vivactil)
 Trimipramine (Surmontil)

Amineptine (Survector, Maneon) and tianeptine (Stablon, Coaxil) are technically TCAs but are atypical, and are grouped elsewhere.

Discontinued/withdrawn
 Butriptyline (Evadyne)
 Demexiptiline (Deparon, Tinoran)
 Fluacizine (Phtorazisin)
 Imipraminoxide (Imiprex, Elepsin)
 Iprindole (Prondol, Galatur, Tetran)
 Metapramine (Timaxel)
 Propizepine (Depressin, Vagran)
 Quinupramine (Kinupril, Kevopril)
 Tiazesim (Altinil) – actually not a TCA but a tricyclic-like antidepressant
 Tofenacin (Elamol, Tofacine) – actually not a TCA but a tricyclic-like antidepressant

Tetracyclic antidepressants (TeCAs)
 Amoxapine (Asendin)
 Maprotiline (Ludiomil)
 Mianserin (Tolvon)
 Mirtazapine (Remeron)
 Setiptiline (Tecipul)

Mianserin, mirtazapine, and setiptiline are also sometimes described as noradrenergic and specific serotonergic antidepressants (NaSSAs).

Monoamine oxidase inhibitors (MAOIs)

Irreversible

Non-selective
 Isocarboxazid (Marplan)
 Phenelzine (Nardil)
 Tranylcypromine (Parnate)

Discontinued/withdrawn

 Benmoxin (Neuralex)
 Iproclozide (Sursum)
 Iproniazid (Marsilid)
 Mebanazine (Actomol)
 Nialamide (Niamid)
 Octamoxin (Ximaol)
 Pheniprazine (Catron)
 Phenoxypropazine (Drazine)
 Pivhydrazine (Tersavid)
 Safrazine (Safra)

Selective for MAO-B
 Selegiline (Eldepryl, Zelapar, Emsam)

Reversible

Non-selective

Discontinued/withdrawn

 Caroxazone (Surodil, Timostenil)

Selective for MAO-A
 Metralindole (Inkazan)
 Moclobemide (Aurorix, Manerix)
 Pirlindole (Pirazidol)

These drugs are sometimes described as reversible inhibitors of MAO-A (RIMAs).

Discontinued/withdrawn

 Eprobemide (Befol)
 Minaprine (Brantur, Cantor)
 Toloxatone (Humoryl)

Mixed

Non-selective
 Bifemelane (Alnert, Celeport) – RIMA, irreversible inhibitor of MAO-B, and weak NRI

Atypical antipsychotics
 Amisulpride (Solian) – approved in low doses as a monotherapy for persistent depression
 Lumateperone (Caplyta) – approved as a monotherapy for bipolar depression
 Lurasidone (Latuda) – approved as a monotherapy for bipolar depression
 Quetiapine (Seroquel) – approved as a monotherapy for bipolar depression

Others

Marketed
 Agomelatine (Valdoxan) – 5-HT2C receptor antagonist and MT1 and MT2 receptor agonist
 Brexanolone (allopregnanolone; Zulresso) – GABAA receptor positive allosteric modulator – approved for postpartum depression
 Bupropion/dextromethorphan (Auvelity) – non-competitive NMDA receptor antagonist, σ1 receptor agonist, serotonin–norepinephrine reuptake inhibitor, norepinephrine–dopamine reuptake inhibitor, other actions
 Esketamine (Spravato) – non-competitive NMDA receptor antagonist, other actions
 Tianeptine (Stablon, Coaxil, Tianeurax) – weak and atypical μ-opioid receptor agonist, other actions

Off-label only
 Ketamine (Ketalar) – non-competitive NMDA receptor antagonist

Discontinued/withdrawn
 α-Methyltryptamine [αMT] (Indopan) – non-selective serotonin receptor agonist, serotonin–norepinephrine–dopamine releasing agent (SNDRA), and weak RIMA
 Etryptamine [α-Ethyltryptamine (αET)] (Monase) – non-selective serotonin receptor agonist, SNDRA, and weak RIMA
 Indeloxazine (Elen, Noin) – serotonin releasing agent (SRA), NRI, and NMDA receptor antagonist
 Medifoxamine (Clédial, Gerdaxyl) – weak serotonin–dopamine reuptake inhibitor (SDRI) and 5-HT2A and 5-HT2C receptor antagonist
 Oxaflozane (Conflictan) – 5-HT1A, 5-HT2A, and 5-HT2C receptor agonist
 Pivagabine (Tonerg) – unknown/unclear mechanism of action

Over-the-counter
The following antidepressants are available both with a prescription and over-the-counter:

 Ademetionine [S-Adenosyl-L-methionine (SAMe)] (Heptral, Transmetil, Samyl) – cofactor in monoamine neurotransmitter biosynthesis
 Hypericum perforatum [St. John's Wort (SJW)] (Jarsin, Kira, Movina) – TRPC6 activator, and various other actions
 Oxitriptan [5-Hydroxytryptophan (5-HTP)] (Cincofarm, Levothym, Triptum) – precursor in serotonin biosynthesis
 Tryptophan (Tryptan, Optimax, Aminomine) – precursor in serotonin biosynthesis

Adjunctive treatments

Atypical antipsychotics
 Aripiprazole (Abilify) – approved as an adjunct to antidepressant for major depression
 Brexpiprazole (Rexulti) – approved as an adjunct to antidepressant for major depression
 Lumateperone (Caplyta) – approved as an adjunct to mood stabilizer for bipolar depression
 Lurasidone (Latuda) – approved as an adjunct to mood stabilizer for bipolar depression
 Olanzapine (Zyprexa) – approved as an adjunct to antidepressant for major depression
 Quetiapine (Seroquel) – approved as an adjunct to antidepressant or mood stabilizer for major depression and bipolar depression

Off-label only
 Risperidone (Risperdal)

Typical antipsychotics

Off-label only
 Trifluoperazine (Stelazine)<ref
name="pmid27514300"></ref>

Others

Off-label only
 Buspirone (Buspar) – 5-HT1A receptor partial agonist
 Lithium (Eskalith, Lithobid) – mood stabilizer (mechanism of action unknown/unclear)
 Thyroxine (T4) – thyroid hormone (thyroid hormone receptor agonist)
 Triiodothyronine (T3) – thyroid hormone (thyroid hormone receptor agonist)

Combination products
 Amitriptyline/chlordiazepoxide (Limbitrol) – TCA and benzodiazepine combination
 Amitriptyline/perphenazine (Etafron) – TCA and typical antipsychotic combination
 Flupentixol/melitracen (Deanxit) – TCA and typical antipsychotic combination
 Olanzapine/fluoxetine (Symbyax) – SSRI and atypical antipsychotic combination – approved as a monotherapy for bipolar depression and treatment-resistant depression
 Tranylcypromine/trifluoperazine (Parstelin, Parmodalin, Jatrosom N, Stelapar) – MAOI and typical antipsychotic combination

References

Drug-related lists
Mood stabilizers